Medazzaland is the ninth studio album by English new wave band Duran Duran. It was released on 14 October 1997 by Capitol Records. The album was never officially released physically in Europe until 2022, and was solely released in North America, Latin America and Japan. It reached number 58 on the Billboard 200 and number 66 on RPMs albums chart.

The front cover features a painting of the band by artist Andrew Day, who created the album artwork, including a pastiche of Patrick Nagel's iconic cover for Rio.

Background
The album is the follow-up to the poorly received covers album Thank You, and bassist John Taylor left the band in January 1997 before recording was complete. With only three members remaining – Nick Rhodes, Simon Le Bon and Warren Cuccurullo – Duran Duran wrote and recorded several new tracks for the album, and re-recorded songs previously done with Taylor. His work remains on only four songs. Cuccurullo later stated that most of the finished album was reworked TV Mania material originally written by himself and Rhodes.

The dismal performance of the album led in part to the dissolution of the band's contract with EMI after almost two decades. EMI gave the band ownership rights and the master tapes to the Medazzaland album, as well as several unreleased audio and videotapes of their 1995 and 1997 concerts. It was rumoured that the band would independently release the album in the UK, but they went on to sign with Hollywood Records and released Pop Trash instead. Even though Medazzaland was available in Europe as an import or digital download, it was only in 2021 (when the band signed a deal for the album with BMG), when it was officially released in the UK on various digital platforms. A physical 25th anniversary release on CD and coloured vinyl followed in 2022.

Singles
Prior to the album's release, the band shopped some of the tracks around Hollywood movie studios in an attempt to get some songs onto popular film soundtrack albums. Paramount Pictures eventually included "Out of My Mind" on the soundtrack to the Val Kilmer film The Saint. The single featured future Medazzaland track "Silva Halo" as a B-side, along with a discarded album track, "Sinner or Saint", the title referencing the film.

In March 1997, the soundtrack and single for "Out of My Mind" were released internationally on Virgin Records, marking the first time a Duran Duran release had been released on an imprint other than EMI/Parlophone/Capitol. The single peaked at number 21 on the UK chart in May. The music video for "Out of My Mind" was filmed by director Dean Karr at Český Krumlov Castle in Český Krumlov, Czech Republic.

The lead single, "Electric Barbarella" (a nod to the film Barbarella, from which the band took their name), was released on 16 September in the United States, and peaked at number 52 on the Billboard Hot 100 on 1 November. It was touted as the first ever song available for digital purchase/download on the internet, and a handful of different mixes were created for the song. An 'exclusive' Dom T remix was made available for download in the US for 99 cents by the company Liquid Audio. However, this pioneering move annoyed many American retailers as they saw it as infringing on their retail territory and they either refused to stock the album or provided little to no promotion of the disc. The music video, directed by Ellen Von Unwerth, involved a robot sex doll and had to be mildly censored before receiving airplay on MTV or VH1; by the time the modified video was delivered, the song had already fallen off the charts. The single artwork featured an illustration based on the model used in Von Unwerth's video and was created by artist Andrew Day, the first of his commissions for the band.

Release
The album was eventually released on 14 October 1997 in North America and Japan. Due to poor sales, plans for a UK release were pushed back, and, later, shelved indefinitely by EMI/Capitol. It was not physically released in any other area of the world for many years, although in July 2008 the album was made available to buy digitally through iTunes Store in Europe and the US. In 2021, BMG picked up the rights to the album with a planned 25th anniversary release in 2022. The album was also available in Mexico (both in CD and cassette formats), Brazil, Argentina, and Venezuela.

Title and composition
The album's title was inspired by Le Bon's treatment with the mind-altering drug midazolam during dental surgery, leaving him in a disconnected state for some time afterwards.

The music varies widely, from the sleazy bounce of "Electric Barbarella" and the dissonant "Big Bang Generation", to the bitter austerity of "Silva Halo" and the simple acoustic sweetness of "Michael You've Got a Lot to Answer For", concluding with the self-deprecating swagger of "Undergoing Treatment". Overall, the album has a heavily layered, processed feel, with clear influences from the electronica genre of the late 1990s.

Other notable songs on the album include "Medazzaland", the first Duran Duran song to feature Nick Rhodes, not Simon Le Bon, on vocals, and "So Long Suicide", a reaction to the death of Kurt Cobain, among other things. The song "Buried in the Sand", with lyrics by Rhodes, was written about John Taylor's departure from the group. Le Bon has said that the song "Michael You've Got a Lot to Answer For", was written for his good friend Michael Hutchence, former lead singer of the band INXS. Hutchence died just a month after the album's release.

Track listing
All tracks are produced by TV Mania in association with Syn Pro Tokyo except where noted.

Notes
  signifies an associate producer
  signifies an additional producer

Sample credits
 "Buried in the Sand" contains a sample of "Raga Jaijaiwanti" by Ustad Sultan Khan (courtesy of Navras Records)

Personnel

Duran Duran 
 Nick Rhodes – keyboards, spoken word (track 1), synth bass (track 13)
 Simon Le Bon – vocals (tracks 2 to 13)
 Warren Cuccurullo – guitar, bass (tracks 3 to 6 and 8 to 10), synth bass (track 13), background vocals (track 5)

Additional musicians
 John Taylor – bass (tracks 1, 2, 7 and 11)
 Steve Alexander – live drums (tracks 1, 2, 5, 7, 10 and 11)
 Anthony J. Resta – live drums (tracks 2, 3, 5, and 8 to 13), mixing (tracks 1 to 5 and 7 to 13), additional production (tracks 1, 8 and 13), additional rhythm and programming
 Dave DiCenso – live drums (track 4)
 Tim Garland – treated soprano sax solo (track 9)
 Talvin Singh – tabla and santoor (tracks 4)
 Jake Shapiro – cello (track 10)
 Ustad Sultan Khan – sarangi (track 8)
 Sally Stapleton – background vocals (track 2)
 Madeleine Farley – background vocals (track 6)
 Mayko Cuccurullo – ultra high vocal effects (track 1)
 Clem Burke – live drum fill (track 3)

Production
 TV Mania – mixing (track 6), production
 Syn Pro Tokyo – associate producer
 Mark Tinley – mixing (track 6), engineering and programming
 Tim Paddock – additional engineering at Metropolis Studios
 Bob St. John – mixing (tracks 1 to 5 and 7 to 13), mix engineering, additional production (tracks 1, 8 and 13)
 Gareth Ashton – mixing assistant
 Dave Collins – mastering (tracks 1 to 11 and 13)
 Henk Kooistra – mastering (track 12)
 Duran Duran – art direction
 Andrew Day – art direction, artwork, photography
 Ellen von Unwerth – photography
 Katrin Geilhausen – photography

Charts

Notes

References

Bibliography

External Links

1997 albums
Capitol Records albums
Duran Duran albums